Matteo Anesi (born 16 August 1984) is an Italian speed skater who won a gold medal in the team pursuit at the 2006 Winter Olympics. He placed 29th in the 1500 m event. After his active career he became one of the coaches of the Italian speed skating team.

Personal records

Personal life
Anesi is married to Dutch former speed skater Marrit Leenstra who is also an Olympic gold medalist.

References

External links
 
 

1984 births
Living people
Italian male speed skaters
Speed skaters at the 2006 Winter Olympics
Speed skaters at the 2010 Winter Olympics
Speed skaters at the 2014 Winter Olympics
Olympic speed skaters of Italy
Olympic medalists in speed skating
Medalists at the 2006 Winter Olympics
Olympic gold medalists for Italy
World Single Distances Speed Skating Championships medalists
Speed skaters at the 2007 Winter Universiade
Universiade medalists in speed skating
Universiade gold medalists for Italy
Medalists at the 2007 Winter Universiade
20th-century Italian people
21st-century Italian people